Salvator duseni is a species of lizard in the family Teiidae. The species is sometimes known commonly as the yellow tegu. It is native to South America.

Etymology
S. duseni is named after Swedish botanist Per Karl Hjalmar Dusén who collected the holotype.

Geographic range
S. duseni is found in Brazil and Paraguay. In Brazil it is found in Bahia, Distrito Federal, Goiás, Mato Grosso, Mato Grosso do Sul, Minas Gerais, Paraná, and Tocantins.

Habitat
The preferred natural habitat of S. duseni is savanna.

Description

Behavior
S. duseni is diurnal and terrestrial.

Diet
An omnivore, S. duseni eats plants, invertebrates, and small vertebrates.

Reproduction
S. duseni is oviparous. Clutch size is approximately 36 eggs.

References

Further reading
Harvey MB, Ugueto GN, Gutberlet RL (2021). "Review of Teiid Morphology with a Revised Taxonomy and Phylogeny of the Teiidae (Lepidosauria: Squamata)". Zootaxa 3459: 1–156. (Salvator duseni, new combination).
Lönnberg E, Andersson LG (1910). "A new Lizard and a new Frog from Paranà". Arkiv för Zoologi 6 (9): 1–11. (Tupinambis duseni, new species, pp. 1–9).
Péres AK, Colli GR (2004). "The Taxonomic status of Tupinambis rufescens and T. duseni (Squamata: Teiidae), with a Redescription of the Two Species". Occasional Papers of the Sam Noble Oklahoma Museum of Natural History 15: 1–12.

Salvator (lizard)
Reptiles of Bolivia
Reptiles of Brazil
Reptiles of Paraguay
Reptiles described in 1910
Taxa named by Einar Lönnberg